Arbury Hall is a Grade I listed  country house in Nuneaton, Warwickshire, England, and the ancestral home of the Newdigate family, later the Newdigate-Newdegate and Fitzroy-Newdegate (Viscount Daventry) families.

History
The hall is built on the site of the former Arbury Priory in a mixture of Tudor and 18th-century Gothic Revival architecture, the latter being the work of Sir Roger Newdigate from designs by Henry Keene.

The 19th-century author George Eliot (Mary Anne Evans) was born on one of the estate farms in 1819, the daughter of the estate's land agent.

In 1911, Sir Francis Alexander Newdigate Newdegate erected, at Arbury Hall, a monument to the memory of George Eliot.

Description

In the arts
George Eliot She immortalised Arbury Hall as "Cheverel Manor" in Scenes of Clerical Life, where it is the setting for "Mr Gilfil's Love Story".

The film Angels & Insects (1995) was shot entirely at Arbury Hall and within the grounds.

Arbury Hall was also used as the fictional Hoxley Manor in the BBC TV series Land Girls (2009).

Ownership
Edmund Anderson (1530–1605), who demolished the priory and built Arbury Hall.

Custodians of Arbury Hall include:

Sir Edmund Anderson (1567–1586)
John Newdegate (1586–1587)
Sir John Newdegate (1587–1610)
John Newdigate (1610–1642)
Sir Richard Newdigate, 1st Baronet (1642–1665)
Sir Richard Newdigate, 2nd Baronet (1665–1710)
Sir Richard Newdigate, 3rd Baronet (1710–1727)
Sir Edward Newdigate, 4th Baronet (1727–1734)
Sir Roger Newdigate, 5th Baronet (1734–1806)
Francis Parker Newdigate (1806–1835)
The Rt Hon. Charles Newdigate-Newdegate (1835–1887)
Lt Gen. Sir Edward Newdigate-Newdegate (1887–1902)
Sir Francis Alexander Newdigate-Newdegate (1902–1936)
The Hon. Mrs Lucia FitzRoy-Newdegate (1936–1950)
Francis Humphrey Maurice FitzRoy Newdegate, 3rd Viscount Daventry (1950–2000)
James Edward FitzRoy Newdegate, 4th Viscount Daventry (2000–present)

See also
Arbury Canals
Arbury Park, South Australia, named after Arbury Hall

References

External links 

 
  English Heritage: detailed architectural description of Grade I listed building
Heritage page about Arbury Hall
Historic Houses Association page about Arbury Hall

Gardens in Warwickshire
Gothic Revival architecture in Warwickshire
Grade I listed buildings in Warwickshire
Historic house museums in Warwickshire
Country houses in Warwickshire
Buildings and structures in Nuneaton